Newspapers in the United States have been published since the 18th century and are an integral part of the culture of the United States. Although a few newspapers including The New York Times, USA Today, and The Wall Street Journal are sold throughout the United States, most U.S. newspapers are published for city or regional markets. The New York Times, The Wall Street Journal, and The Washington Post are often referred to as the United States' "newspaper of record".

History 

The history of American newspapers dates back to the early 18th century, when the first colonial newspapers were published. In the beginning, newspapers were a sideline for printers, but they eventually became a political force and played a role in the campaign for American independence. The First Amendment to the U.S. Constitution guaranteed freedom of the press, and the U.S. Postal Service Act of 1792 provided subsidies for the delivery of newspapers. During the First Party System (1790s-1810s), both parties sponsored papers to reach their loyal supporters. In the 1930s, the Penny press began to play a major role in American journalism, and technological advancements such as the telegraph and faster printing presses helped to expand the press of the nation. In the early 20th century, newspapers were profitable and influential, but with the rise of television in the 1920s, the role of newspapers began to shift. In the late 20th century, many American journalism outlets became part of big media chains, and the rise of digital journalism in the 21st century has caused a business crisis for newspapers, as readers and advertisers shift to the Internet.

Demographics 

Metropolitan newspapers survive in all major metropolitan regions, with some regions having multiple papers, though this has declined in modern times. Many smaller cities have had local newspapers, again, this having declined over time. 

There have also been many African-American newspapers, foreign-language papers, and other specialized newspapers. As of 2023 there were 24 newspapers published in prisons.

Archives 
Many libraries provide microfilm archives of major U.S. newspapers.

Ownership 
Media conglomerates like Gannett Company, The McClatchy Company, Hearst Communications and others, publish a large percentage of the nation's papers.

Publication 
Most general-purpose newspapers are either printed daily or weekly. They are in part advertising-driven, including classified advertisements, but also receive income from newsstand sales and subscriptions.

Major cities usually have alternative weeklies (New York City's Village Voice or Los Angeles' L.A. Weekly, for example), which rely entirely on advertising, and are free to the public. A newspaper meeting particular standards of circulation, including having a subscription or mailing list, is designated as a newspaper of record. With this designation, official notices may be published, such as fictitious business name announcements.

The number of daily newspapers in the United States has declined over the past half-century, according to Editor & Publisher, the trade journal of American newspapers. In particular, the number of evening newspapers has fallen by 50% since 1970, while morning editions and Sunday editions have grown.

For comparison, in 1950, there were 1,772 daily papers (and 1,450, or about 70%, of them were evening papers) while in 2000, there were 1,480 daily papers (and 766—or about half—of them were evening papers.

See also 
 List of newspapers in the United States
 List of American journalism awards
 Pulitzer Prize

References

External links 
 19th Century Historical United States Newspapers archive at Indiana University
 US newspapers searchable database, University of Chicago
 List of US Newspapers with Rates, University of Chicago
 "History of Newspapers",  Mitchell Stephens, Collier's Encyclopedia article at New York University
 "Unite State News Spot"